Track Bangas is a record production team consisting of Jeffrey "Smitty" Smith, Derrick "D." St. Amand, Justin "J. Pill" Pipkins, Dana Harmon and Justin "J. Jones" Jones. They were best known early on for their "banging" drums, thus their moniker Track Bangas, as well as their sampled production. The production team is also well known by their signature tag, “You are listening to a Track Bangas production", at the beginning of their beats.

They have worked with artists like Lil Wayne, Rick Ross, Trae, Yelawolf, DJ Khaled, Mystikal, Pusha T, Meek Mill, 2 Chainz, Tech N9ne, Chamillionaire, Young Money Entertainment's Jae Millz, and Inspectah Deck among others.

They are currently working with Shady Records artist, Yelawolf, and are the in-house producers for Kurupt and Trae.

Early life and background 
Smitty and D. were both born in western Massachusetts in 1985 and were raised in Holyoke, MA. Smitty's first instrument was the recorder in elementary school. He then worked his way up to the saxophone, which led him to be recruited to another school for his raw, untrained skill. D. took a liking to the art of DJing at an unusually young age (4 years old). At that age, his parents bought him a Big Bird turntable and Michael Jackson's Bad album and the three were inseparable.

Smitty and D. first met in 1995 while playing youth football in the 5th grade, but were attending different middle schools. The two also attended different high schools but would later meet up again in the 11th grade. Though they shared the same homeroom for 2 years, the two did not speak very much. Throughout high school, Smitty began to shift his focus toward engineering, while D. continued to DJ parties, weddings, etc. They both graduated in June 2003.

Smitty, who at the time had been known for recording local artists, was starting to become known around the city for making beats as well. With over 300 songs recorded from various artists, he had eventually recorded just about every rapper/singer within a 15-mile radius at least once.

D. began to venture into rapping as a hobby, making parodies to popular songs with his cousin. They began to take themselves a little more serious and formed a rap group with a few other close friends called the Starting Lineup.

One month after graduating high school, Smitty and D. were reintroduced when a member of Starting Lineup booked studio time with Smith. About 25 songs and a demo later, the group eventually went their separate ways. D. continued to work with Smitty on a more regular basis, focusing on a solo project. After completing a handful of songs, D. developed an interest in producing.

D. studied Smitty's style and sound of production, and quickly adhered to the procedures of developing tracks. D., who had always favored sampled beats, learned how to chop samples to create his own sound. Meanwhile, Smitty was beginning to broadcast his beat collection and the Track Bangas name all throughout the internet.

Career

2006–2009 
Track Bangas expanded by adding Mr. Inkredible, producer from Houston, TX, to the roster.

In 2006, due to the huge buzz they had created on the 'net, the duo hit the road to push their artist, GV's project. Their first stop was Columbus, Ohio. After selling over 1,000 units on the streets within weeks, D. and a street team began traveling back and forth between Phoenix, Arizona and Las Vegas, Nevada selling cds, while Smitty remained in Ohio producing records and managing Track Bangas' internet campaign.

Collectively, they sold over 30,000 units independently with GV. Though business was good, D. returned to Massachusetts about 6 months later for a family emergency. Smitty also returned to Massachusetts about 8 months after that to regroup and organize the next steps.

In 2009, the duo set up a production studio in the downtown area of their hometown, Holyoke, MA. Then in 2010, Track Bangas expanded by adding producer, J. Pill (Dallas, Texas) and guitarist, Dana Harmon (Columbus, Ohio) to the team.

After about a year and 8 months, the duo decided to pack up and drive to Los Angeles to further their careers.

2010–Present 
In 2010, two weeks before Thanksgiving, Track Bangas left Massachusetts for California.

Within 7 months of moving to LA, Track Bangas acquired endorsements from Zephyr Hats & Apparel Zoo clothing, became in-house producers for Kurupt, and landed a track with Yelawolf on the Driver: San Francisco video game.

Discography

External links 
 Official Site

Record producers from Massachusetts